Scramble is a 1970 British children's sports drama film directed by David Eady and starring Ian Ramsey, Robin Askwith, Lucinda Barnes and Stephen Mallett.

Cast
Ian Ramsey as Jimmy Riley
Stuart Lock as Colin Buxton
Stephen Mallett as Brian Buxton
Lucinda Gorell-Barnes as Vicky Buxton
Gareth Marks as Oscar Heppelwhite
Robin Askwith as Lennie
Carling Paton as Cliff
Alfred Marks as Mr. Hepplewhite
James Hayter (uncredited)
David Lodge (uncredited)
Peggy Sinclair (uncredited)
William Lucas (uncredited)
Graham Stark (uncredited)

References

External links

1970 films
1970 drama films
1970s children's drama films
Films directed by David Eady
British children's drama films
Children's Film Foundation
1970s English-language films
1970s British films